TUSD may refer to one or more of the following:

Tustin Unified School District 
Tucson Unified School District
Torrance Unified School District
Thousand US dollars